Shrimpfish, also called razorfish, are five small species of marine fishes in the subfamily Centriscinae of the family Centriscidae. The species in the genera Aeoliscus and Centriscus are found in relatively shallow tropical parts of the Indo-Pacific, while the banded bellowsfish, which often is placed in the subfamily Macroramphosinae instead, is restricted to deeper southern oceans.

Shrimpfish are nearly transparent and flattened from side to side with long snouts and sharp-edged bellies. A thin, dark stripe runs along their bodies. These stripes and their shrimp-like appearance are the source of their name. They swim in a synchronized manner with their heads pointing downwards.

Species

References

Centriscidae